Huenecura or Huenencura was the Mapuche Toqui from 1604 to 1610.  He replaced Paillamachu who died in 1603.  He was replaced by Aillavilu in 1610.

References

Sources 
  Juan Ignatius Molina, The Geographical, Natural, and Civil History of Chili, Vol II., Longman, Hurst, Rees, and Orme, London, 1809
  José Ignacio Víctor Eyzaguirre, Historia eclesiastica: Politica y literaria de Chile, IMPRENTA DEL COMERCIO, VALPARAISO, June 1830 List of Toquis, pp. 162–163, 498–500.

16th-century Mapuche people
17th-century Mapuche people
People of the Arauco War
Indigenous leaders of the Americas